Oksana Paslas (Оксана Паслась; born  in Lviv) was a Ukrainian group rhythmic gymnast representing her nation at international competitions.

She participated at the 2004 Summer Olympics in the all-around event together with Maria Bila, Yulia Chernova, Olena Dzyubchuk, Yelyzaveta Karabash and Inga Kozhokhina finishing 9th.
She competed at world championships, including at the 2005 World Rhythmic Gymnastics Championships.

References

External links

http://ukrsg.tripod.com/eventspages/2000_clubsnat_res.htm

1986 births
Living people
Ukrainian rhythmic gymnasts
Sportspeople from Lviv
Olympic gymnasts of Ukraine
Gymnasts at the 2004 Summer Olympics
21st-century Ukrainian women